Eurosia substrigillata is a moth of the family Erebidae first described by Walter Rothschild in 1912. It is found in Papua New Guinea.

References

Nudariina
Moths described in 1912